Escape from Sobibor is a 1987 British television film which aired on ITV and CBS.  It is the story of the mass escape from the Nazi extermination camp at Sobibor, the most successful uprising by Jewish prisoners of German extermination camps (uprisings also took place at Auschwitz-Birkenau and Treblinka). The film was directed by Jack Gold and shot in Avala, Yugoslavia (now Serbia). The full 176-minute version shown in the UK on 10 May 1987 was pre-empted by a 143-minute version shown in the United States on 12 April 1987.

The script, by Reginald Rose, was based on Richard Rashke's 1983 book of the same name, along with a manuscript by Thomas Blatt, "From the Ashes of Sobibor", and a book by Stanisław Szmajzner, Inferno in Sobibor. Alan Arkin, Joanna Pacuła, and Rutger Hauer were the primary stars of the film. The film received a Golden Globe Award for Best Miniseries or Television Film and Hauer received a Golden Globe Award for Best Actor in a Supporting Role—Television Film or Miniseries. Esther Raab was a camp survivor who had assisted Rashke with his book and served as a technical consultant.

Background
On 14 October 1943, members of the Sobibor camp's underground resistance succeeded in covertly killing 11 German SS-Totenkopfverbände officers and a number of Sonderdienst Ukrainian and Volksdeutsche guards. Of the 600 inmates in the camp, roughly 300 escaped, although all but 50–70 were later re-captured and killed. After the escape, SS Chief Heinrich Himmler ordered the death camp closed. It was dismantled, bulldozed under the earth, and planted over with trees to cover it up.

Plot

The film begins with a new trainload of Polish Jews arriving for processing at Sobibor. The German Commandant gives them a welcome speech, assuring the new arrivals that the place is a work camp. Other SS officers move along the assembled lines of prisoners, selecting a small number who have trade skills (such as goldsmiths, seamstresses, shoemakers, and tailors). The remaining prisoners are sent away to a different part of the camp from which a pillar of smoke rises day and night. It is some time before the new prisoners realise that Sobibor is a death camp; all of the other Jews are exterminated in gas chambers, and their corpses are cremated in large ovens. The small number of prisoners kept alive in the other part of the camp are charged with sorting the belongings taken from those who are murdered and then repairing the shoes, recycling the clothing, and melting down any silver or gold to make jewellery for the SS officers. Despite their usefulness, these surviving prisoners' existence is precarious; beatings and murders can occur at any time.

Gustav Wagner is the most clever and sadistic of the German officers. When two prisoners escape from a work detail in the nearby forest, Wagner forces the remaining thirteen prisoners of the work gang to each select one other prisoner to die with them (under the threat that if they refuse, he will select fifty) and then executes all twenty six.

The leader of the prisoners, Leon Feldhendler, realises that when the trains eventually stop coming, the camp will have outlived its usefulness, and all the remaining Jews will be murdered. He devises a plan for every prisoner to escape, by luring the SS officers and NCOs into the prisoners' barracks and work huts one by one and killing them as quietly as possible. Once all the Germans are dead, the prisoners will assemble into columns and simply march out of the camp as if they have been ordered to, and it is hoped that the Ukrainian Guards, not knowing what is going on, and with no Germans left alive to give orders or raise the alarm, will not interfere. A new group of prisoners arrives: Russian Jews who were soldiers with the Soviet army. Their leader, Sasha Pechersky, and his men, willingly join the revolt, their military skills proving invaluable.

The Camp Kommandant leaves for several days, taking Wagner with him, which proves an advantage as the most sadistic of the SS officers will be absent. On 14 October 1943, the plan goes into action. One by one, SS officers and NCOs are lured into traps set by groups of prisoners armed with knives and clubs. Eleven Germans are killed, but one officer, Karl Frenzel, unwittingly evades his killers, discovers the corpse of one of his colleagues, and raises the alarm. By now, the prisoners have assembled on the parade ground and, realising the plan has been discovered, Pechersky and Feldhendler urge the prisoners to revolt and flee the camp. Most of the 600 prisoners stampede for the perimeter fences, some of the Jews using captured rifles to shoot their way through the Ukrainian guards. Other guards open fire with machine guns from observation towers, cutting many of the fleeing prisoners down, and other would-be escapees are killed on the minefield surrounding the camp. But over 300 Jews reach the forest and escape.

As the survivors flee deeper into the forest, famed newscaster Howard K. Smith narrates the fates that befell some of the survivors on whose accounts the film was based. Of the 300 prisoners who escaped, only approximately 50 survived to see the end of the war in 1945. Pechersky makes it back to Soviet lines and rejoins the Red Army, surviving the war, and Feldhendler lives to see the end of the war but is killed shortly afterwards in a clash with anti-semitic Poles. After the uprising, which was the largest escape from a prison camp of any kind in Europe during World War II, Sobibor was bulldozed to the ground, and trees were planted on the site to remove any sign of its existence.

Cast
In credits order:

 Alan Arkin as Leon Feldhendler
 Joanna Pacuła as Luka (Gertrude Poppert)
 Rutger Hauer as Lieutenant Aleksandr 'Sasha' Pechersky
 Hartmut Becker as SS-Hauptscharführer Gustav Wagner
 Jack Shepherd as Itzhak Lichtman
 Emil Wolk as Samuel Freiberg
 Simon Gregor as  Stanisław 'Shlomo' Szmajzner
 Linal Haft as Kapo Porchek
 Jason Norman as Thomas 'Toivi' Blatt
 Robert Gwilym as Chaim Engel
 Eli Nathenson as Moses Szmajzner
 Kurt Raab as SS-Oberscharführer Karl Frenzel
 Eric Caspar as SS-Hauptsturmführer Franz Reichleitner
 Hugo Bower as SS-Oberscharführer Rudolf Beckmann
 Klaus Grünberg as SS-Oberscharführer Erich Bauer
 Wolfgang Bathke as SS-Unterscharführer Hurst
 Henning Gissel as SS-Scharführer Fallaster
 Henry Stolow as SS-Untersturmführer Johann Niemann
 Ullrich Haupt as SS-Scharführer Josef Wolf
 Patti Love as Eda Fiszer Lichtman
 Judith Sharp as Bajle Sobol
  as Selma Wijnberg
 David Miller as Tailor Mundek
 Jack Chissick as Hershel Zuckerman
 Ned Vukovic as Morris
 Sara Sugarman as Naomi
 Peter Jonfield as Kapo Sturm
 Dijana Kržanić as Esther Terner
 Irfan Mensur as Kalimali
 Zoran Stojiljković as Boris
 Svetolik Nikačević as Old Man
 Miša Janketić as Oberkapo Berliner
 Dejan Čavić as Kapo Spitz
 Zlatan Fazlagić as Weiss
 Predrag Milinković as Kapo Jacob
 Svetislav Goncić as Gardener
 Gojko Baletić as Guard (uncredited)
 Milan Erak as SS Corporal (uncredited)
 Rastislav Jović as Shlomo's Father (uncredited)
 Erol Kadić as Gardener
 Miroljub Lešo as Prisoner (uncredited)
 Bozidar Pavićević-Longa as SS-Sturmmann Ivan Klatt (uncredited)
 Howard K. Smith as Narrator (American version) (uncredited)
 Dragomir Stanojević as Guard (uncredited)
 Predrag Todorović as Guard (uncredited)
 Jelena Žigon as Shlomo's Mother (uncredited)

See also 
 List of Holocaust films
 List of survivors of Sobibor
 Sobibor (2018), a film about the same topic starring Konstantin Khabensky
 The Grey Zone (2001), movie about the uprising in Auschwitz-Birkenau

Footnotes

References

External links 
 
 
 
 

1987 films
1987 television films
1987 drama films
1980s war films
British war drama films
British prison drama films
British World War II films
Holocaust films
CBS original programming
ITV television dramas
Films set in 1943
Films about prison escapes
Films set in Poland
Films shot in Serbia
Films shot in Yugoslavia
Films based on American novels
Drama films based on actual events
World War II films based on actual events
Films directed by Jack Gold
Films scored by Georges Delerue
Films with screenplays by Reginald Rose
Best Miniseries or Television Movie Golden Globe winners
Sobibor extermination camp
Films shot in Belgrade
1980s prison drama films
1980s British films
British drama television films
Films about Jewish resistance during the Holocaust
World War II television films